The Karakaya Dam is one of the 21 dams of the Southeastern Anatolia Project of Turkey, built on the Euphrates River and completed in 1987.

Conflict with Iraq and Syria
The Euphrates River is an important water source for both Syria and Iraq, and both countries expressed concerns about the Karakaya Dam construction project. A treaty guaranteed a minimum water flow of  through the dam.

Involuntary resettlement

According to Terminski (2013), the construction of the Karakaya Dam resulted in involuntary resettlement of approximately 30,000 people.

See also

List of conventional hydroelectric power stations
List of power stations in Turkey
Tohma Bridge

Notes

References

External links

Official GAP web site 
Built by Brown Boveri & Co., Ltd

Dams on the Euphrates River
Dams in Diyarbakır Province
Hydroelectric power stations in Turkey
Southeastern Anatolia Project
Dams completed in 1987